Valters Nollendorfs is board chair of the Museum of the Occupation of Latvia and a professor emeritus of German language and literature at the University of Wisconsin–Madison. 

Nollendorfs was born 22 March 1931 in Riga, Latvia, where his father, Kārlis Nollendorfs, was a police officer in the Old Town. At the age of thirteen, together with his family, he fled Latvia to Westphalia, Germany, where he spent almost six years in a displaced persons camp. In 1950 he emigrated to Texas. In 1954 he received a B.S. in pedagogy at the University of Nebraska, and in 1955 he completed an M.A. in German language and literature there. In 1962 he earned a Ph.D. in German literature at the University of Michigan, submitting a dissertation on Goethe's Faust. From 1961 until his retirement in 1994, Nollendorfs taught at the University of Wisconsin–Madison, where he chaired the Department of German from 1975 to 1980 and again from 1984 to 1988. In 1981–82, he chaired the Division of 18th and Early 19th Century German Literature of the Modern Language Association.

At the age of 24, Nollendorfs became the first editor of the Latvian-language journal  (New Tide). In the late 1950s he was in charge of the American Latvian Youth Association. He worked for the children's magazine Mazputniņš and the publishing company Ceļinieks, and he conducted many courses for young people in North America. Beginning in 1974, he held various offices in the Association for the Advancement of Baltic Studies, ultimately serving as its president and as executive director of academics. Since 1982 he has been affiliated with the Baltische Historische Kommission. 

In 1988, after living in the diaspora for many years, Nollendorfs returned for a visit to Latvia, where in 1990 he became one of the first Fulbright lecturers. He has been a member of the Latvian Academy of Sciences since 1990 and member of the President of Latvia's Historians Commission since 1998. From 1996 to 2000 he was director of the Association for the Advancement of Baltic Studies' Baltic office.

Over the years Nollendorfs has authored two books and edited more than fifteen volumes (including With Dance Shoes in Siberian Snows by Sandra Kalniete). He has also served as the editor of scholarly journals, including Monatshefte at the University of Wisconsin–Madison.

Awards
Nollendorfs was decorated a knight of the Order of the Three Stars on 2 May 1997 and an officer of the Order of Merit of the Federal Republic of Germany on 5 December 2017.

References

External links 

1931 births
Living people
Latvian emigrants to Germany
University of Nebraska–Lincoln alumni
 University of Wisconsin–Madison College of Letters and Science alumni
University of Wisconsin–Madison faculty
Officers Crosses of the Order of Merit of the Federal Republic of Germany
German emigrants to the United States